The United States Federal Budget for Fiscal Year 1997, was a spending request by President Bill Clinton to fund government operations for October 1996-September 1997.  Figures shown in the spending request do not reflect the actual appropriations for Fiscal Year 1997, which must be authorized by Congress. The requested budget was submitted to Congress on February 5, 1996.

Overview
The stated objectives for President Clinton's FY1997 budget are to: (1) Balance the federal budget within seven years by making cuts in entitlements and discretionary spending while enacting modest tax cuts and (2) Maintaining growth while protecting senior citizens, middle-class families and children. The Clinton Administration projected a US$40 billion surplus by 2002.

A key aspect of the FY1997 budget is what was known as the "trigger". The trigger program essentially ensured that tax cuts after 2000 would end if the deficit was not at least US$20 billion below the Congressional Budget Office's estimate. Conversely, if the deficit was at least US$20 billion below CBO estimates then the tax cuts would continue and the money exceeding the US$20 estimate is used to reduce discretionary spending.

Total Receipts

(in billions of dollars)

Total spending

The President's budget for FY1997 totals $1.635 trillion. Percentages in parentheses indicate estimated percentage change compared to 1996. This budget request is broken down by the following expenditures:
Mandatory spending: $1.093 trillion (+XX.X%)
$364.8 billion (+X.X%) - Social Security
$187.4 billion (+X.X%) - Medicare
$105.6 billion (+XX.X%) - Medicaid
$103.9 billion (-XX%) - Means-tested entitlements
$-4.3 billion (-XX%) - Deposit Insurance
$138.1 billion (-X.X%) - Other mandatory programs
$-41 billion (+XX.X%) - Undistributed off-setting receipts
$238.5 billion (+XX.X%) - Interest on National Debt
Discretionary spending: $542.3 billion (+1.1%)
$2.4 (0.1%)- Legislative Branch
$3.2 (0.3%) - The Judiciary
$0.2 (0.0%) - Executive Office of the President
$12.1 (-0.2%) - Presidential Appropriated Funds
$251.8 billion (-7.0%) - Department of Defense (including Overseas Contingency Operations)
$33.3 billion (+1.4%) - Department of Health and Human Services
$35.4 billion (-0.8%) - Department of Transportation
$19.1 billion (+0.4%) - Department of Veterans Affairs
$5.0 billion (0.0%) - Department of State and Other International Programs
$33.2 billion (+3.0%) - Department of Housing and Urban Development
$25.0 billion (0.0%) - Department of Education
$16.7 billion (-0.1%) - Department of Energy
$15.3 billion (-0.4%) - Department of Agriculture
$14.9 billion (+2.9%) - Department of Justice
$13.7 billion (-0.5%) - National Aeronautics and Space Administration
$4.1 billion (+0.2%) - Department of Commerce
$10.2 billion (0.0%) - Department of Labor
$11.3 billion (+0.8%) - Department of the Treasury
$7.3 billion (0.0%) - Department of the Interior
$6.7 billion (+0.1%) - Environmental Protection Agency
$5.4 billion (+0.5%) - Social Security Administration
$0.8 billion (-0.2%) - Small Business Administration
$0.5 billion (+0.1%) - General Services Administration
$0.2 billion (0.0%) - Office of Personnel Management
$14.0 billion (0.0%) - Other Agencies
$0.5 billion - Other programs

Deficit

Debt increases

Causes of Change in CBO Forecasts

Renewable energy

References

1997
1997 in American politics
United States federal budget